Pier Francesco Mazzucchelli (commonly known as il Morazzone; 1573–1626) was an Italian painter and draughtsman who was active in Milan.  He is mainly known for his altarpieces, but his outstanding achievements are large decorative frescoes for the Sacro Monte di Varese and the Sacro Monte di Varallo.

Life
He was born in Morazzone, near Varese, Lombardy, the son of a mason, who soon after his birth moved to Rome. There he was influenced by Ventura Salimbeni and Cavalier D'Arpino and began to work in a Mannerist style. In Rome, he painted some canvases and also his first frescoes (Adoration by the Magi and a Visitation) in San Silvestro in Capite (1596). His style also shows exposure to another pupil of D'Arpino, Caravaggio. His depictions of martyrdom and ecstasy are imbued with the morbid religiosity characteristic of Lombardy in his age.

He relocated to Milan in 1597. In Lombardy, he painted frescoes for the Cappella del Rosario in San Vittore in  Varese (1599), and worked in some of the Sacri Monti of the Alps. This activity began with the Ascent to Calvary (1602–1606) chapel in the Sacro Monte of Varallo where he was influenced by Gaudenzio Ferrari and developed a more dramatic style. In 1608-1609 he completed the Flagellation chapel in the Sacro Monte of Varese then returned to Varallo for the Ecce Homo chapel (1610–13). The last of this series is the Porziuncola chapel  (1616–20) in the Sacro Monte di Orta. His other frescoes include the Cappella della Buona Morte in San Gaudenzio in Novara, the altarpiece with the Virgin of the Rosary in the Certosa di Pavia and the depiction of some of the Prophets frescoed for the nave of the Piacenza Cathedral, completed after his death by  the Bolognese painter Guercino.

He also painted  altarpieces for many churches in Northern Italy and canvases for private collectors. He collaborated with Giovanni Battista Crespi (Il Cerano) and Giulio Cesare Procaccini in the painting of the Quadroni of San Carlo Borromeo for the Duomo of Milan. Among the pupils and followers of il Morazzone were Francesco Cairo, Stefano & Gioseffo Danedi, Isidoro Bianchi, Giovanni Paolo & Giovanni Battista Recchi, Paolo Caccianiga, Tommaso Formenti, Giambatista Pozzi, and Cristoforo Martinolli della Rocca.

References

Sources

External links

1573 births
People from the Province of Varese
16th-century Italian painters
Italian male painters
17th-century Italian painters
Painters from Milan
Italian Baroque painters
1626 deaths
Italian Mannerist painters
Catholic painters